Red Canyon is a 1949 American Western film directed by George Sherman and starring Ann Blyth, Howard Duff and George Brent. It was based on the novel Wildfire by Zane Grey.

Plot
The plot revolves around Black Velvet, a wild stallion that runs rampant across the range. Two people, reformed bad man Lin Sloan (played by Howard Duff) and tomboyish farmer's daughter Lucy Bostel (Ann Blyth), think they can tame him.  In the process, they tame each other.

Cast
 Ann Blyth as Lucy Bostel
 Howard Duff as Lin Sloan
 George Brent as Matthew Bostel
 Edgar Buchanan as Jonah Johnson
 John McIntire as Floyd Cordt
 Chill Wills as Brackton
 Jane Darwell as Aunt Jane
 Lloyd Bridges as Virgil Cordt
 James Seay as Joel Creech
 Edmund MacDonald as Farlane
 David Clarke as Sears
 Denver Pyle as Hutch
 Willard W. Willingham as Van (as William Willingham)

Production
Parts of the film were shot in Duk Creek, Cascade Falls, Kanab Canyon, Kanab Race Track, Aspen Mirror Lake, Paria, Tibbets Valley, and Bryce Canyon in Utah.

References

External links
 
 
 

1949 films
1949 Western (genre) films
Films based on works by Zane Grey
American Western (genre) films
1940s English-language films
Universal Pictures films
Films directed by George Sherman
Films scored by Walter Scharf
Films about horses
Films shot in Utah
1940s American films